Marinobacter alkaliphilus is an alkaliphilic and mesophilic bacterium from the genus of Marinobacter from the Ocean which has been investigated from the Ocean Drilling Program.

References

Further reading 
 

Alteromonadales
Bacteria described in 2005